An election to Torfaen County Borough Council took place on 5 May 2022 as part of the 2022 Welsh local elections.

Welsh Labour held the council.

Results

References 

Torfaen County Borough Council elections
2022 Welsh local elections